Laguna Colorada is an ignimbrite shield of the Altiplano-Puna volcanic complex at an altitude of  in the Potosi Department of Bolivia.

The shield is not clearly associated with a caldera but appears to contain a sag structure. The ignimbrite field is bordered by the Laguna Colorada to the west, Cerro Torque in the north and Quetena to the east; Laguna Colorada is also the origin of the name of the shield. Likewise, the "Tatio formation" at El Tatio originates from eruptions at Laguna Colorada; the 700,000 years old Tatio ignimbrite however is considered to be separate. An older ignimbrite was erupted 2.21±0.05 million years ago.

An ignimbrite is associated with Laguna Colorada. Several fall deposits occur both within and below the ignimbrite. This ignimbrite is also known as the Tatio ignimbrite and given a volume of  dense rock equivalent, or the Aguadita tuffs. The ignimbrite is one of the youngest in the region and keeps a noticeable texture in high altitude images. Deposits perhaps correlated to this ignimbrite have been recovered in the Quebrada de Humahuaca region.

The active geothermal fields of El Tatio and Sol de Manana are located around the Laguna Colorada system. , a pilot geothermal power project was underway at Laguna Colorada. An electrical conductivity anomaly beneath Laguna Colorada has been interpreted either as new magma or hydrothermally altered material.

References 

Volcanoes of Bolivia
Calderas of Bolivia
Pleistocene shield volcanoes
Pyroclastic shields
Pleistocene calderas